The Hawaii Rainbow Warriors college football team represents the University of Hawaiʻi at Mānoa (Hawaii) in the Mountain West Conference (Mountain West). The Warriors compete as part of the National Collegiate Athletic Association (NCAA) Football Bowl Subdivision (FBS). The program has had 22 head coaches since it began play during the 1909 season. Timmy Chang was hired in January 2022 as the head coach at Hawaii.

The team has played in over 950 games over 97 seasons of Hawaii football. In that time, three coaches have led the Warriors in postseason bowl games: Bob Wagner, June Jones and Greg McMackin. Two of those coaches also won conference championships: Jones and McMackin won or shared a combined three as a member of the Mountain West.

Otto Klum is the leader in seasons coached and games won, with 84 victories during his 19 years with the program. Dave Crawford has the highest winning percentage of those who have coached more than one game, with .857. Fred von Appen has the lowest winning percentage of those who have coached more than one game, with .139. Of the 22 different head coaches who have led the Warriors Clark Shaughnessy has been inducted into the College Football Hall of Fame in South Bend, Indiana.

Key

Coaches

Notes

References 
General

 
 

Specific

Lists of college football head coaches

Hawaii sports-related lists